Philophthalmus is a genus of trematodes belonging to the family Philophthalmidae.

The species of this genus are found in America and Australia.

Species:

Philophthalmus andersoni 
Philophthalmus attenuatus 
Philophthalmus coturnicola 
Philophthalmus cupensis 
Philophthalmus distomatosa 
Philophthalmus gralli 
Philophthalmus hegeneri 
Philophthalmus hovorkai 
Philophthalmus lacrymosus 
Philophthalmus lucipetus 
Philophthalmus megalurus
Philophthalmus muraschkinzewi 
Philophthalmus nocturnus 
Philophthalmus nyrocae 
Philophthalmus oschmarini 
Philophthalmus palpebrarum 
Philophthalmus posaviniensis 
Philophthalmus rhionica 
Philophthalmus skrjabini 
Philophthalmus stercusmuscarum
Philophthalmus stugii 
Philophthalmus zalophi

References

Trematoda